Gilberto Román (29 November 1961 – 27 June 1990) was a Mexican professional boxer and a member of the 1980 Mexican Olympic team. Román was a two-time WBC and Lineal Super Flyweight Champion and is considered by many fans to be one of the great champions in this division. Gilberto was trained by Boxing Hall of Famer Ignacio Beristáin.

Amateur career
As an amateur boxer he won some Mexican National Championships and was a member of the 1980 Mexican Olympic team. He fought with Ezequiel Cano Molina, from Cd. Valles, S.L.P. in Naranjos, Veracruz, México, and with many other important amateur boxers.

1980 Olympic record

Below are the results of Gilberto Roman, a Mexican flyweight boxer who competed in the 1980 Moscow Olympics:

 Round of 32: bye
 Round of 16: defeated Alberto Mercado (Puerto Rico) referee stopped contest in first round
 Quarterfinal: lost to Petar Lesov (Bulgaria) by decision, 1-4

Professional career
Román made his professional debut on August 29, 1981 with a knockout victory over Gilberto Morales. He was known as a knockout puncher in the earlier portion of his career, but after suffering two consecutive losses in 1985, he began refining his boxing technique. After accumulating a record of 40-3-0, including a rematch victory over former champion Antonio Avelar, he received his first opportunity for a world title.

WBC Super Flyweight Championship
In 1986, Román dethroned long reigning WBC and Lineal Super Flyweight Champion Jiro Watanabe, ending the Japanese champion's streak of 12 consecutive title victories.

Román was a busy traveling champion. In his first title defense, he defeated Edgar Monserrat in France. He then traveled to Argentina where he defeated Ruben Osvaldo Condori and was held to a draw against Argentinian former WBA Flyweight Champion Santos Laciar on 30 August 1986. He then defeated Kongtoranee Payakaroon in Thailand and returned to France where he defeated Antoine Montero. In his first fight in Mexico since becoming champion, he decisioned former champion Frank Cedeno. Román met Laciar in a rematch on 16 May 1987 in France, with Laciar taking the title by technical decision in a fight stopped on cuts in the eleventh-round despite Román leading on all three scorecards by one point.

Regaining title
Sugar Baby Rojas took the title from Laciar and Román earned another title shot against the new champion. On 8 April 1988, Román regained the title with a twelve-round decision.

He then traveled to Japan where he defeated Yoshiyuki Uchida and future champion Kiyoshi Hatanaka. Next he faced Rojas in a rematch and decisioned him once again. Roman began 1989 with a victory over Puerto Rican challenger Juan Carazo in a fight in which each boxer was dropped to the floor in the fourth round. In his next fight he avenged his loss to Laciar via unanimous decision Following his victory over Laciar, Román lost the title to Ghana's Nana Konadu on 7 November 1989. Konadu lost the title to Sung-Kil Moon, whom Román challenged on 9 June 1990, losing by a TKO in the ninth round. That was Román's last fight, as he was killed in an automobile accident less than three weeks later.

Román had a record of 54 wins, 6 losses and 1 draw, with 35 wins by knockout. His total of 11 successful title defenses ranks second highest in the history of the super flyweight division.

Professional boxing record

| style="text-align:center;" colspan="8"|54 Wins (35 Knockouts, 19 Decision), 6 Losses, 1 Draw
|-style="text-align:center; background:#e3e3e3;"
|style="border-style:none none solid solid; "|Res.
|style="border-style:none none solid solid; "|Record
|style="border-style:none none solid solid; "|Opponent
|style="border-style:none none solid solid; "|Type
|style="border-style:none none solid solid; "|Round
|style="border-style:none none solid solid; "|Date
|style="border-style:none none solid solid; "|Location
|style="border-style:none none solid solid; "|Notes
|- align=center
|Loss
|54-6-1
|align=left| Sung-Kil Moon
|
|
|
|align=left|
|align=left|
|- align=center
|Win
|54-5-1
|align=left| Mike Phelps
|
|
|
|align=left|
|align=left|
|- align=center
|Loss
|53-5-1
|align=left| Nana Konadu
|
|
|
|align=left|
|align=left|
|- align=center
|Win
|53-4-1
|align=left| Santos Laciar
|
|
|
|align=left|
|align=left|
|- align=center
|Win
|52-4-1
|align=left| Juan Carazo
|
|
|
|align=left|
|align=left|
|- align=center
|Win
|51-4-1
|align=left| Sugar Baby Rojas
|
|
|
|align=left|
|align=left|
|- align=center
|Win
|50-4-1
|align=left| Kiyoshi Hatanaka
|
|
|
|align=left|
|align=left|
|- align=center
|Win
|49-4-1
|align=left| Yoshiyuki Uchida
|
|
|
|align=left|
|align=left|
|- align=center
|Win
|48-4-1
|align=left| Sugar Baby Rojas
|
|
|
|align=left|
|align=left|
|- align=center
|Win
|47-4-1
|align=left| Jorge Ramirez
|
|
|
|align=left|
|align=left|
|- align=center
|Loss
|46-4-1
|align=left| Santos Laciar
|
|
|
|align=left|
|align=left|
|- align=center
|Win
|46-3-1
|align=left| Frank Cedeno
|
|
|
|align=left|
|align=left|
|- align=center
|Win
|45-3-1
|align=left| Antoine Montero
|
|
|
|align=left|
|align=left|
|- align=center
|Win
|44-3-1
|align=left| Kongtoranee Payakaroon
|
|
|
|align=left|
|align=left|
|- align=center
|Draw
|43-3-1
|align=left| Santos Laciar
|
|
|
|align=left|
|align=left|
|- align=center
|Win
|43-3
|align=left| Ruben Osvaldo Condori
|
|
|
|align=left|
|align=left|
|- align=center
|Win
|42-3
|align=left| Edgar Monserrat
|
|
|
|align=left|
|align=left|
|- align=center
|Win
|41-3
|align=left| Jiro Watanabe
|
|
|
|align=left|
|align=left|
|- align=center
|Win
|40-3
|align=left| Arturo Castillo
|
|
|
|align=left|
|align=left|
|- align=center
|Win
|39-3
|align=left| Fidel Martinez
|
|
|
|align=left|
|align=left|
|- align=center
|Win
|38-3
|align=left| Arnulfo Luna
|
|
|
|align=left|
|align=left|
|- align=center
|Win
|37-3
|align=left| Armando Morales Terron
|
|
|
|align=left|
|align=left|
|- align=center
|Win
|36-3
|align=left| Freddie Santos
|
|
|
|align=left|
|align=left|
|- align=center
|Win
|35-3
|align=left| Mario Gomez
|
|
|
|align=left|
|align=left|
|- align=center
|Win
|34-3
|align=left| Oscar Bolivar
|
|
|
|align=left|
|align=left|
|- align=center
|Win
|33-3
|align=left| Antonio Avelar
|
|
|
|align=left|
|align=left|
|- align=center
|Loss
|32-3
|align=left| Jorge Ramirez
|
|
|
|align=left|
|align=left|
|- align=center
|Loss
|32-2
|align=left| Antonio Avelar
|
|
|
|align=left|
|align=left|
|- align=center
|Win
|32-1
|align=left| Diego Avila
|
|
|
|align=left|
|align=left|
|- align=center
|Win
|31-1
|align=left| Wayne Lynumn
|
|
|
|align=left|
|align=left|
|- align=center
|Win
|30-1
|align=left| Bernardo Ibarra
|
|
|
|align=left|
|align=left|
|- align=center
|Win
|29-1
|align=left| Berlin Olivetti
|
|
|
|align=left|
|align=left|
|- align=center
|Win
|28-1
|align=left| Manuel Aguilar
|
|
|
|align=left|
|align=left|
|- align=center
|Win
|27-1
|align=left| Paul Ferreri
|
|
|
|align=left|
|align=left|
|- align=center
|Win
|26-1
|align=left| Rodolfo Martinez
|
|
|
|align=left|
|align=left|
|- align=center
|Win
|25-1
|align=left| Freddie Santos
|
|
|
|align=left|
|align=left|
|- align=center
|Win
|24-1
|align=left| George Garcia
|
|
|
|align=left|
|align=left|
|- align=center
|Win
|23-1
|align=left| Ron Cisneros
|
|
|
|align=left|
|align=left|
|- align=center
|Win
|22-1
|align=left| Pedro Rojas
|
|
|
|align=left|
|align=left|
|- align=center
|Win
|21-1
|align=left| Armando Loredo
|
|
|
|align=left|
|align=left|
|- align=center
|Win
|20-1
|align=left| Jose Torres
|
|
|
|align=left|
|align=left|
|- align=center
|Win
|19-1
|align=left| Jose Sosa
|
|
|
|align=left|
|align=left|
|- align=center
|Win
|18-1
|align=left| Elid Fernandez
|
|
|
|align=left|
|align=left|
|- align=center
|Win
|17-1
|align=left| Ubaldo Gonzalez
|
|
|
|align=left|
|align=left|
|- align=center
|Win
|16-1
|align=left| Antonio Escobar
|
|
|
|align=left|
|align=left|
|- align=center
|Win
|15-1
|align=left| Lupe Acosta
|
|
|
|align=left|
|align=left|
|- align=center
|Win
|14-1
|align=left| Ramon Noguera
|
|
|
|align=left|
|align=left|
|- align=center
|Win
|13-1
|align=left| Carlos De La Paz
|
|
|
|align=left|
|align=left|
|- align=center
|Win
|12-1
|align=left| Fidel Martinez
|
|
|
|align=left|
|align=left|
|- align=center
|Win
|11-1
|align=left| Bobby Ruiz
|
|
|
|align=left|
|align=left|
|- align=center
|Loss
|10-1
|align=left| Diego Avila
|
|
|
|align=left|
|align=left|
|- align=center
|Win
|10-0
|align=left| Heriberto Saavedra
|
|
|
|align=left|
|align=left|
|- align=center
|Win
|9-0
|align=left| Ciro Cayetano
|
|
|
|align=left|
|align=left|
|- align=center
|Win
|8-0
|align=left| Alejo Garcia
|
|
|
|align=left|
|align=left|
|- align=center
|Win
|7-0
|align=left| Miguel Angel Juarez
|
|
|
|align=left|
|align=left|
|- align=center
|Win
|6-0
|align=left| Gilberto Villacana
|
|
|
|align=left|
|align=left|
|- align=center
|Win
|5-0
|align=left| Juan Zarate
|
|
|
|align=left|
|align=left|
|- align=center
|Win
|4-0
|align=left| Juan Carlos Montalvo
|
|
|
|align=left|
|align=left|
|- align=center
|Win
|3-0
|align=left| Leo Castellanos
|
|
|
|align=left|
|align=left|
|- align=center
|Win
|2-0
|align=left| Leonardo Valdez
|
|
|
|align=left|
|align=left|
|- align=center
|Win
|1-0
|align=left| Gilberto Morales
|
|
|
|align=left|
|align=left|

See also
List of super-flyweight boxing champions
List of Mexican boxing world champions

References

External links

Gilberto Román - CBZ Profile

1961 births
1990 deaths
Boxers from Baja California
Super-flyweight boxers
World super-flyweight boxing champions
World Boxing Council champions
Boxers at the 1979 Pan American Games
Pan American Games competitors for Mexico
Boxers at the 1980 Summer Olympics
Olympic boxers of Mexico
Mexican male boxers
Sportspeople from Mexicali